Nezamabad (also Romanized as Nez̧āmābād) is a village in Shurab Rural District, in the Central District of Arsanjan County, Fars Province, Iran. At the 2006 census, its population was 518, in 119 families.

References 

Populated places in Arsanjan County